Millotia is a genus of small annual herbs in the tribe Gnaphalieae within the family Asteraceae.

The genus name honours French historian Claude-François-Xavier Millot.

 Species
All known species are endemic to Australia:

References

Asteraceae genera
Asterales of Australia
Gnaphalieae